In histopathology, a palisade is a single layer of relatively long cells, arranged loosely perpendicular to a surface and parallel to each other.  A rosette is a palisade in a halo or spoke-and-wheel arrangement, surrounding a central core or hub.  A pseudorosette is a perivascular radial arrangement of neoplastic cells around a small blood vessel.

Rosette

A rosette is a cell formation in a halo or spoke-and-wheel arrangement, surrounding a central core or hub. The central hub may consist of an empty-appearing lumen or a space filled with cytoplasmic processes. The cytoplasm of each of the cells in the rosette is often wedge-shaped with the apex directed toward the central core: the nuclei of the cells participating
in the rosette are peripherally positioned and form a ring or halo around the hub.

Pathogenesis
Rosettes may be considered primary or secondary manifestations of tumor architecture. Primary rosettes form as a characteristic growth pattern of a given tumor type whereas secondary rosettes result from the influence of external factors on tumor growth. For example, in the latter instance, regressive cell swelling may centripetally displace the cytoplasm as the nucleus is squeezed to the periphery. Although the presence of primary rosettes may suggest a given diagnosis, usually this finding alone is not considered absolutely pathognomic for one specific tumor type.

Loss or gain of genetic information is the main cause of rosette and pseudorosette formation. The cell populations exhibiting neuronal differentiation are believed to secrete surface glycoproteins and glycolipids which mediate cell-to-cell recognition and adhesion. One hypothesis is that these sticky cell surface markers cause the developing cell bodies to cluster or aggregate and their primitive neurites to tangle. As the cells grow, the neurite tangle remains centrally located and the cell bodies are squeezed to the periphery, thus explaining the rosette pattern. Depending upon their location, ependymal cells may display 2 cell poles. A luminal pole projects
to the ependymal lining of a ventricle and a “submesenchymal pole” projects toward the surface of the brain demonstrating glial processes and peripherally situated footplates. Frieda and Pollak conceptualize the architecture of ependymomas as
a primitive neural tube turned inside out with the submesenchymal poles converging toward a central vessel, thus forming a pseudorosette rather than projecting centrifugally toward the pia.

Causes
True rosettes are mainly found in neuropathologic disorder and are also present in osteosarcoma, non-Hodgkin lymphoma, fibromyxoid sarcoma, medullary thyroid carcinoma, embryonal tumor with abundant neuropil and true rosettes (ETANTR), rhambdomyosarcoma, chronic cholestasis and chronic active hepatitis, tobacco rosette: complex viral disease, malaria, adenocarcinoma in colon and rectum in the
Aghamiri population, hyalinizing spindle cell fused with giant rosette, endometrial stromal sarcoma with hyalinizing giant rosettes, embryonal tumor etc.

Flexner–Wintersteiner rosettes (spoke-and-wheel shaped cell formation seen mainly in retinoblastoma) have been described as a form of palisading.

Flexner–Wintersteiner rosette

A Flexner–Wintersteiner rosette is a spoke-and-wheel shaped cell formation seen in retinoblastoma and certain other ophthalmic tumors. 

Unlike the center of the Homer Wright rosette, the central lumen is devoid of fiber-rich neuropil. The defining feature of this rosette is central extension of cytoplasmic projections of the surrounding cells. Like the Homer Wright rosette, the Flexner–Wintersteiner rosette represents a specific form of tumor differentiation. Electron microscopy reveals that the tumor cells forming the Flexner–Wintersteiner rosette have ultrastructural features of primitive photoreceptor cells. Furthermore, the rosette lumen shows similar staining patterns as in rods and cones, suggesting that Flexner–Wintersteiner rosettes represent a specific form of retinal differentiation. In addition to being a characteristic finding in retinoblastomas, Flexner–Wintersteiner rosettes may also be found in pinealoblastomas and medulloepitheliomas.

Flexner–Wintersteiner rosettes were first described by Simon Flexner (1863–1946), a physician, scientist, administrator, and professor of experimental pathology at the University of Pennsylvania (1899–1903). Flexner noted characteristic clusters of cells in an infantile eye tumor which he called retinoepithelioma. A few years later, in 1897, Austrian ophthalmologist Hugo Wintersteiner (1865–1946) confirmed Flexner's observations and noted that the cell clusters resembled rods and cones. These characteristic rosette formations were subsequently recognized as important features of retinoblastomas.

Pseudorosette
A pseudorosette is a perivascular radial arrangement of neoplastic cells around a small blood vessel. Pseudorosettes are present in neuroblastoma, medulloblastoma, malignant melanoma, ependymoma, Merkel cell carcinoma, neuroendocrine tumor of skin, seborrheic keratosis, dendritic cell neurofibroma, astroblastoma, large cell neuroendocrine tumor of cervix, clear cell ependymoma of spinal cord, celiac disease, nasal tumor of olfactory origin, rosette forming glioneural tumor (RGNT), oncocytoma, Wilm's tumor, pheochromocytoma of urinary bladder.

Homer Wright pseudorosette

A Homer Wright pseudorosette is a type of pseudorosette in which differentiated tumor cells surround the neuropil. Examples of tumors containing these are neuroblastoma, medulloblastoma, pinealoblastoma, and primitive neuroectodermal tumors of bone. Homer Wright rosettes are considered "pseudo" in the sense that they are not true rosettes. True rosettes are Flexner–Wintersteiner rosette, which contain an empty lumen. Homer Wright rosettes contain abundant fibrillary material. They are named for James Homer Wright.

Perivascular pseudorosette
A perivascular pseudorosette consists of a spoke-wheel arrangement of cells with tapered cellular processes radiates around a wall of a centrally placed vessel. The modifier “pseudo” differentiates this pattern from the Homer Wright and Flexner-Wintersteiner rosettes,
perhaps because the central structure is not actually formed by the tumor itself, but instead represents a native, non-neoplastic element. Also, some early investigators argued about the definition of a central lumen, choosing “pseudo” to indicate that the hub was
not a true lumen but contained structures. Nevertheless, this pattern remains extremely diagnostically useful and the modifier unnecessarily leads to confusion. Perivascular pseudorosettes are encountered in most ependymomas regardless of grade or variant. As such, they are significantly more sensitive for the diagnosis of ependymomas than true ependymal rosettes. Unfortunately, perivascular pseudorosettes are also less specific in that they are also encountered in medulloblastomas, PNETs, central neurocytomas,
and less often in glioblastomas, and a rare pediatric tumor, monomorphous pilomyxoid astrocytomas.

Pineocytomatous/neurocytic pseudorosettes
Histologic features of these two tumors are virtually identical, including their tendency to form neuropilrich rosettes, referred to as pineocytomatous/neurocytic rosettes in central neurocytoma. Both are quite similar to the Homer Wright rosette, but they are generally larger and more irregular in contour. The cells of the pineocytomatous/neurocytic rosettes are also considered to be much more differentiated than the cells forming Homer Wright rosettes in that the nuclei are slightly larger, more rounded, much less mitotically active, and paler or less hyperchromatic. In rare cases, these rosettes may aggregate in a sheet of back-to-back clusters resembling field stone pavement.

Clinical significance of rosettes and pseudorosettes
The neuropathologic diagnosis of brain tumors entails the microscopic examination of conventional formalin-fixed paraffin-embedded tissue samples surgically removed from a radiographically defined lesion. Pathologists rely on visual clues such as pattern recognition when examining the stained tissue with a microscope, much as radiologists rely on grayscale patterns of densities and intensities on images. Some histologic patterns of cellular architecture are distinctive if not pathognomonic whereas others are
less specific, but nevertheless considerably narrow the differential diagnosis. The precise biologic bases for some of the observed
microscopic patterns are poorly understood though their recognition remains useful nonetheless. One commonly encountered neuropathologic histologic architectural pattern seen within certain tumors is the rosette. The purpose of this report is to review
the patterns of rosettes and pseudorosettes in the context of such tumors as medulloblastoma/primitive neuroectodermal tumor (PNET),
retinoblastoma, ependymoma, central neurocytoma and pineocytoma.

Methods for diagnosis of rosettes and pseudorosettes
More advanced methods of tissue examination such as histochemical and immunohistochemical profiling, genetic analysis, and electron microscopy have been developed, the microscopic review of H&E stained material remains a critical component of tumor diagnosis. Immunohistochemical evidence of neuronal differentiation is found in nearly all cases with neuronal markers such as synaptophysin, neuronspecific enolase, and neurofilament protein. Some medulloblastomas may also display other forms of differentiation as demonstrated by the presence of the astrocytic marker glial fibrillary acidic protein. Skeletal muscle and melanocytic differentiation are considerably less common and define the medullomyoblastoma and melanotic medulloblastoma variants, respectively.

Long palisades

Palisades that are generally longer than a rosette or pseudorosette can be seen in neural tumors such as Schwannoma, as well as in ameloblastomas. It can also be seen in nodular basal-cell carcinomas.

Visually similar findings
Pseudopalisading, a visually similar finding, is the formation of hypercellular zones that typically surrounds necrotic tissue.

References

Cellular processes